The Schuylkill Expressway , locally known as "the Schuylkill", is a freeway through southern Montgomery County and the city of Philadelphia. It is the easternmost segment of Interstate 76 (I-76) in the U.S. state of Pennsylvania. It extends from the Valley Forge interchange of the Pennsylvania Turnpike in King of Prussia, paralleling its namesake Schuylkill River for most of the route, southeast to the Walt Whitman Bridge over the Delaware River in South Philadelphia. It serves as the primary corridor into Philadelphia from points west. Maintenance and planning are administered through Pennsylvania Department of Transportation (PennDOT) District 6, with the Delaware River Port Authority (DRPA) maintaining the approach to the Walt Whitman Bridge.

Constructed over a period of 10 years from 1949 to 1959, a large portion of the expressway predates the 1956 introduction of Interstate Highway System; many of these portions were not built to contemporary standards. The rugged terrain, limited riverfront space covered by the route and narrow spans of bridges passing over the highway have largely stymied later attempts to upgrade or widen the highway. With the road being highly over capacity, it has become notorious for its chronic congestion. An average of 163,000 vehicles use the road daily in Philadelphia County, and an average of 109,000 use the highway in Montgomery County, making it the busiest road in Pennsylvania. Its narrow lane and left shoulder configuration, left lane entrances and exits (nicknamed "merge or die"), common construction activity, and generally congested conditions have led to many accidents, critical injuries, and fatalities, leading to the highway's humorous nickname of the "Surekill Expressway" or, in further embellishment, the "Surekill Distressway" or the “Surekill Crawlway".

Route description

Montgomery County

The Schuylkill Expressway begins at the Valley Forge interchange of the Pennsylvania Turnpike in the community of King of Prussia in Upper Merion Township, Montgomery County. The I-76 designation continues west on the Pennsylvania Turnpike from this point, while the Pennsylvania Turnpike from this point east is designated I-276. The road heads southeast from the trumpet interchange as a nine-lane freeway carrying four westbound lanes and five eastbound lanes that is designated as part of I-76, passing through the Valley Forge Interchange toll plaza. Past the toll plaza, the Schuylkill Expressway narrows to four lanes, with two lanes in each direction, and comes to an eastbound exit and entrance with North Gulph Road, providing access to Valley Forge National Historical Park and the Village at Valley Forge residential and retail development, the latter of which contains the King of Prussia Town Center lifestyle center, and a westbound exit and entrance with Mall Boulevard, providing access to the King of Prussia shopping mall to the northeast of the road. There is also a westbound entrance from Pulaski Drive just east of the toll plaza. The freeway passes businesses and comes to an interchange with U.S. Route 202 (US 202), the eastern terminus of US 422, and Swedesford Road that serves King of Prussia. A westbound collector–distributor road carrying two lanes provides access to the US 202/US 422/Swedesford Road and Mall Boulevard interchanges. I-76 passes under Chester Valley Rail Trail and Norfolk Southern Railway's Dale Secondary railroad line and continues east-southeast as a six-lane road between residential areas to the southwest and commercial areas to the northeast, eventually narrowing to four lanes. The freeway heads east and comes to a westbound exit and entrance with South Gulph and South Henderson roads. The Schuylkill Expressway curves southeast near wooded areas of homes before coming to an interchange with Pennsylvania Route 320 (PA 320) in the community of Gulph Mills. This interchange has an eastbound exit and entrance and a westbound exit. Within this interchange, the highway passes over SEPTA's Norristown High Speed Line and crosses Gulph Creek. Past the PA 320 interchange, I-76 continues east-southeast through woodland near residential development, heading into Lower Merion Township. The freeway enters the borough of West Conshohocken and comes to an interchange with I-476 that also has ramps providing access to PA 23 and serving the boroughs of West Conshohocken and Conshohocken.

Past the I-476 interchange, the Schuylkill Expressway heads east and comes to a westbound exit and eastbound entrance providing access to PA 23 and Conshohocken, passing near residential and commercial development. The freeway passes over PA 23 and leaves West Conshohocken for Lower Merion Township, where it heads through wooded areas and runs on top of a cliff, with Norfolk Southern Railway's Harrisburg Line and the Schuylkill River parallel to the north below the cliff and another cliff rising above the highway to the south. East of Conshohocken at about milemarker 331, it curves sharply southeast in a 90-degree turn locally known as the "Conshohocken Curve" or "Conshy Curve", which has a history of traffic congestion and dangerous conditions. I-76 continues southeast through wooded areas, with the railroad tracks and the river parallel to the northeast. Farther southeast, the Schuylkill Expressway crosses Mill Creek and comes to a westbound exit and eastbound entrance with Hollow Road that provides access to the community of Gladwyne. The freeway passes over the Flat Rock Tunnel carrying Norfolk Southern Railway's Harrisburg Line and continues to the southeast with the Schuylkill River to the northeast and the railroad tracks to the southwest. I-76 comes to a diamond interchange with Belmont Avenue and Green Lane, with Belmont Avenue heading south through the community of Bala Cynwyd in Lower Merion Township, and Green Lane crossing the river into the neighborhood of Manayunk in the city of Philadelphia. Following this interchange, the freeway passes under the Manayunk Bridge that carries an extension of the Cynwyd Heritage Trail across the Schuylkill River. The Schuylkill Expressway passes over Norfolk Southern Railway's Harrisburg Line and runs southeast between the West Laurel Hill Cemetery to the southwest and an industrial area to the northeast that is sandwiched between the railroad tracks and the river. I-76 comes to an interchange with City Avenue on the border of Lower Merion Township and the city of Philadelphia in Philadelphia County; City Avenue heads southwest as US 1 and northeast across the Schuylkill River on the City Avenue Bridges to an interchange with Ridge Avenue, Lincoln Drive, and Kelly Drive.

Philadelphia County

Past the City Avenue interchange, I-76 enters the city of Philadelphia and becomes concurrent with US 1, with the Schuylkill Expressway widening to eight lanes and running between the West Falls Yard on Norfolk Southern Railway's Harrisburg Line and the river to the north and wooded areas of Fairmount Park to the south. US 1 splits from I-76 by heading northeast on the Roosevelt Expressway, while I-76 continues south on the Schuylkill Expressway, heading through Fairmount Park and running parallel to CSX Transportation's Trenton Subdivision railroad line, Martin Luther King Jr. Drive, the Schuylkill River Trail, and the Schuylkill River to the east. The freeway curves to the southwest, with CSX Transportation's Trenton Subdivision heading east away from the road and CSX Transportation's Harrisburg Subdivision railroad line beginning to run parallel. I-76 comes to a diamond interchange with Montgomery Drive that provides access to Fairmount Park and serves the Mann Center for the Performing Arts. Following this, the Schuylkill Expressway narrows to six lanes and turns to the southeast, running through more of the park with the railroad tracks, Martin Luther King Jr. Drive, the Schuylkill River Trail, and the Schuylkill River parallel to the northeast. The freeway passes under CSX Transportation's Harrisburg Subdivision and comes to an interchange with US 13 and US 30 at Girard Avenue. Within this interchange, the highway passes under the Pennsylvania Railroad, Connecting Railway Bridge that carries Amtrak's Northeast Corridor railroad line across the Schuylkill River before heading under the Girard Avenue Bridge that carries US 13 (Girard Avenue) across the river. US 30 becomes concurrent with I-76 on the Schuylkill Expressway at this point and the road heads south, with the Philadelphia Zoo to the west and Martin Luther King Jr. Drive, the Schuylkill River Trail, and the Schuylkill River still parallel to the east. The freeway turns southeast and runs between Amtrak's Northeast Corridor to the southwest and the river drive, trail, and river to the northeast, with Boathouse Row on the opposite bank of the river. The Schuylkill Expressway comes to an eastbound exit and westbound entrance with Spring Garden Street, which heads east across the Schuylkill River toward the Philadelphia Museum of Art. The freeway continues south, heading east of Amtrak's Penn Coach Yard, and comes to an interchange with the western terminus of I-676, which heads east along with US 30 on the Vine Street Expressway into Center City.

Following this, I-76 narrows to four lanes and heads south between the Amtrak yard to the west and the Schuylkill River to the east. The road comes to an interchange with Market Street (PA 3) and 30th Street that provides access to 30th Street Station that serves Amtrak, SEPTA Regional Rail, and NJ Transit's Atlantic City Line along with the Cira Centre and University City. At this point, the Schuylkill Expressway dips below street level and runs in a tunnel sandwiched between 30th Street Station and the city's former main Post Office facility to the west and the river to the east, with Schuylkill Avenue running at street level above the tunnel and intersecting John F. Kennedy Boulevard (PA 3 west), Market Street (PA 3 east), Chestnut Street, and Walnut Street. Past the interchange, the freeway returns to ground level and runs southwest between Amtrak's Northeast Corridor to the northwest and the Schuylkill River to the southeast, coming to an interchange with South Street that has left exits and entrances. I-76 continues southwest alongside the river, with athletic fields belonging to the University of Pennsylvania to the northwest of the road. The Schuylkill Expressway passes under the Schuylkill Arsenal Railroad Bridge that carries CSX Transportation's Harrisburg Subdivision across the river before coming to an eastbound exit and westbound entrance providing access to University Avenue.

Following this, the freeway passes over the Schuylkill River on the Schuylkill Expressway Bridge and heads into South Philadelphia. The highway passes over CSX Transportation's Philadelphia Subdivision railroad line and heads south-southwest near urban residential and commercial areas, reaching a westbound exit and eastbound entrance with 34th Street just south of Wharton Street that provides access to Grays Ferry Avenue. I-76 widens to six lanes and continues south near urban development, curving southeast and running between the former Philadelphia Energy Solutions oil refinery and Philadelphia Gas Works to the southwest and urban neighborhoods to the northeast and reaching an eastbound interchange for 28th Street and a westbound interchange with Vare Avenue and Mifflin Street. The Schuylkill Expressway comes to an interchange with Passyunk and Oregon avenues that also has an eastbound exit and westbound entrance to 26th Street that provides access to PA 291 and Philadelphia International Airport. At this point, I-76 narrows to four lanes and turns south, with a CSX Transportation railroad branch parallel to the west and CSX Transportation's Harrisburg Subdivision parallel to the east. This marks the point heading eastbound where the DRPA maintains the road. The freeway makes a sharp turn to the east and passes under the Harrisburg Subdivision, heading near commercial areas and coming to a westbound exit and eastbound entrance with the eastern terminus of PA 291 at Penrose Avenue, providing access to Philadelphia International Airport. The Schuylkill Expressway continues east near urban residential neighborhoods and reaches an interchange with PA 611 (Broad Street). From here, I-76 widens to six lanes and passes north of the South Philadelphia Sports Complex and Live! Casino & Hotel Philadelphia, coming to an interchange with 7th Street and Packer Avenue that has an eastbound exit and entrance and a westbound exit. A short distance later, the freeway comes to a westbound exit and eastbound entrance providing access to I-95 and Front Street. Immediately after, the road has a westbound toll plaza for the Walt Whitman Bridge. The freeway heads onto the seven-lane Walt Whitman Bridge, which carries it over Front Street, I-95, Conrail Shared Assets Operations' Swanson Street Industrial Track, industrial areas in the Port of Philadelphia, Christopher Columbus Boulevard, the Philadelphia Belt Line Railroad, and finally the Delaware River. At this point, the Schuylkill Expressway ends and I-76 continues into New Jersey.

History

Plans for a limited-access highway along the west bank of the Schuylkill River originated in 1932, as part of a proposed cars-only parkway system for the Philadelphia area similar to the contemporary system being built in New York City. The "Valley Forge Parkway" was to have run from Fairmount Park to Valley Forge State Park (now Valley Forge National Historical Park) with plans for a later extension to Reading via Pottstown. However, planning for the proposed parkway system stalled and the plan was eventually abandoned.

Planning for today's expressway began in 1947, when the city of Philadelphia approved plans to develop a highway connecting the city with the terminus of the planned Philadelphia Extension of the Pennsylvania Turnpike near Valley Forge. The highway was designed by engineers Michael Rapuano, who had previously aided in the design of the Garden State Parkway, and Bill Allen of Gannett Fleming. The new expressway largely followed the earlier planned parkway route from Valley Forge to Fairmount Park, while also extending into southern Philadelphia and across the Delaware River into New Jersey. Two alternatives were proposed south of University City: one routing would continue along the west bank of the river into Southwest Philadelphia to its confluence near Philadelphia International Airport, where it would tunnel underneath the Delaware to Paulsboro, New Jersey; the other would cross the Schuylkill south of University City and bisect South Philadelphia, crossing the Delaware River into Gloucester City, New Jersey. Planned expansions of the airport in the path of the former proposal led to adoption of the routing through South Philadelphia.

Construction of the road began in 1949. The road was completed in stages, with a short segment near King of Prussia opening in 1951 along with the turnpike's Philadelphia Extension, with the section from King of Prussia to Conshohocken opening a year later. The section between Conshohocken and City Avenue opened in 1954. The Walt Whitman Bridge opened in 1957. The expressway was completed through Fairmount Park in 1959, and, in 1960, the entire expressway was complete with the opening of the segment through University City. 

The Schuylkill Expressway was initially designated as PA 43 and was cosigned with I-80S between King of Prussia and Center City and I-680 between Center City and the Walt Whitman Bridge when the Interstate Highway System was designated in 1956.  Prior to the roadways being signed as Interstates, I-395 was to be designated along the Schuylkill Expressway from the Vine Street Expressway to the Walt Whitman Bridge; however, I-680 was preferred to be the final designation for this route. On April 16, 1963, Pennsylvania wanted to renumber its Interstate numbers. Part of this was the renumbering from I-80S into I-76, and all of its auxiliary routes into I-x76. The Federal Highway Administration approved the request on February 26, 1964. As a result, I-80S became I-76 and I-680 became I-676. In addition to this renumbering, the PA 43 designation was removed from the Schuylkill Expressway. In 1972, the I-76 and the I-676 designations were switched onto their current routes, with the entire length of the Schuylkill Expressway designated as I-76. Immediately after its completion, operational studies performed on the Schuylkill Expressway found that the route would be unable to cope with the area's growing traffic demands, due to the many substandard design elements and compromises incorporated to cope with the rugged, difficult routing of the road. In 1962, plans were announced for a parallel expressway along the east bank of the Schuylkill River known as the Manayunk Expressway; however, these plans were quickly withdrawn due to substantial opposition. An alternative plan was then introduced to widen the entire highway to eight lanes in time for the US Bicentennial in 1976; however, these plans were also shelved due to local disapproval. A scaled-down widening project was successfully undertaken from 1969 to 1972 to widen a short section of the road to six lanes through Fairmount Park.

In the almost seven decades since its opening, congestion on the expressway has steadily increased. Plans to expand the expressway to eight lanes by building an upper deck, including high-occupancy toll lanes, were advocated by former Pennsylvania House Speaker John Perzel, but never came to fruition. PennDOT completed a scaled back version of a $23.7-million (equivalent to $ in ) project to add 29 webcams on the Schuylkill Expressway between the Conshohocken Curve and Passyunk Avenue.

The closed lane of the road was later reopened temporarily until full repairs could be made.

Exactly three months later, on September 8, 2011, heavy rains caused by Tropical Storm Lee caused a rockslide in the vicinity of the Conshohocken Curve, flooding near Belmont Avenue, and a mudslide by Girard Avenue. For hours, motorists were stuck at various locations in both directions between I-476 and Girard Avenue until the mess could be cleaned up.

In May 2011, the new westbound entrance at South Gulph and South Henderson roads in King of Prussia was completed and in November the westbound exit was completed. The new interchange cost $10.5 million (equivalent to $ in ) and used money from the American Recovery and Reinvestment Act of 2009.

PennDOT has installed variable speed limit signs along the Schuylkill Expressway, where the speed limit can be lowered due to factors such as inclement weather or accidents as well as to manage traffic flow. The variable speed limit signs were activated on April 8, 2021. The project incorporates variable-message signs to alert motorists to traffic congestion ahead. It could also coordinate with SEPTA to provide motorists with real-time mass transit information to give commuters an option to exit the highway and use public transportation to finish their trip at some point. There are also future plans to coordinate traffic signals on roads leading to the Schuylkill Expressway and install ramp meters on entrance ramps to the highway. PennDOT is in the preliminary stages of studying plans to use the right shoulder of the Schuylkill Expressway as a travel lane in certain sections during peak periods; construction of these lanes is not expected to begin until sometime in the mid-2020s.

Exit list
Mileposts and exit numbers reflect the entire length of I-76, which is concurrent with the Pennsylvania Turnpike from the Ohio state line to the Valley Forge Interchange.

See also

References

External links

 Pennsylvania Highways: I-76
 I-76 at AARoads.com
 Pennsylvania Roads - I-76 - Schuylkill Expwy.
 The Roads of Metro Philadelphia: Schuylkill Expressway (I-76)

Interstate 76 (Ohio–New Jersey)
Transportation in Montgomery County, Pennsylvania
Transportation in Philadelphia
Interstate Highways in Pennsylvania